The Dallas County District Attorney is the elected, or appointed by the Texas Governor in the event of a vacancy, district attorney (DA) of Dallas County, Texas.  Currently, this position is held by John Creuzot, a Democrat who defeated Faith Johnson, appointed by Texas Governor Greg Abbott, after Susan Hawk resigned in 2016.<  The office prosecutes offenses under Texas state law classified as felonies, Class A and B misdemeanors, appeals of Class C misdemeanors (punishable by fine only), and Class C misdemeanors filed in the Justice of the Peace courts, generally by non-municipal police agencies.  (Federal law violations are prosecuted by the U.S. Attorney for the United States District Court for the Northern District of Texas).

List of DAs
John Creuzot, Democrat, 2019–present
Faith Johnson, Republican, 2016–2018
Susan Hawk, Republican, 2015–2018 (resigned on September 6, 2016)
Craig Watkins, Democrat, 2007–2015
Bill Hill, Republican, 1999-2007
John Vance, Republican, (first elected in 1986) January 1987–?
Henry Wade, Democrat, 1951–1987

See also
 Allegheny County District Attorney
 Baltimore County State's Attorney
Dallas DNA
 Denver District Attorney's Office
 District Attorney of Philadelphia
 King County Prosecuting Attorney
 Los Angeles County District Attorney
 Milwaukee County District Attorney
 New York County District Attorney
 San Diego County District Attorney
 San Francisco District Attorney's Office

References

External links
Official website

Dallas County, Texas
County district attorneys in Texas